The Battle of Warns was a battle of the Friso-Hollandic Wars between Count William IV of Holland and the Frisians which took place on 26 September 1345. The annual commemoration of the battle is important for many nationalist Frisians. The Frisians won the battle and repelled the 'Hollanders' from the eastern coast of the Zuiderzee.

Attack
After the Hollandic counts completed their conquest of West Frisia, they planned the conquest of Middle Frisia, which now forms most of the present province of Friesland.

In 1345, William IV, count of Holland, prepared to conquer Middle Frisia by crossing the Zuiderzee with a large fleet and with the help of French and Flemish knights, some of whom had just returned from a crusade.

He set sail in Enkhuizen to cross the Zuiderzee, together with his uncle John of Beaumont, and landed near Stavoren and Laaxum. They planned to use the Sint-Odulphus monastery near Stavoren as a fortification. The Hollandic knights wore armour, but had no horses as there was not enough room in the ships, which were full of building materials and supplies. William's troops set fire to the abandoned villages of Laaxum and Warns and started to advance towards Stavoren. 

In the countryside around Warns, the Hollandic count was attacked by the local inhabitants. Despite their heavy armor, the knights were no match for the furious Frisian farmers and fishermen. The path the Hollandic knights chose to flee led straight to the Red Cliffs. 

As they fled, they entered a swamp where they were decisively beaten. Their commander William IV of Holland was killed. When John of Beaumont heard what had happened, he ordered a retreat back to the ships. They were pursued by the Frisians and only a few made it to Amsterdam.

Tactical mistakes
The battle was marked by a number of tactical mistakes by the Hollanders. First, they divided their force in two. William landed north of Stavoren and his uncle Jan landed south. 

In addition, William continued the attack in haste without waiting for his archers. With a small group of 500 men, he reached St. Odulphusklooster because the Frisians purposely moved back. But they then cut Willem from the bulk of his troops and defeated him. 

After Count Willem was killed, the Frisians turned against his main troops, who could not flee because the ships were offshore. When these troops were defeated, they attacked John of Beaumont, who had not participated until then. The Frisians could beat him because his camp was chosen poorly, with the sea at his back, so that his army had nowhere to retreat. The Frisians took the battle with the Hollanders in the water where they beat them down.

Losses 

The disaster sparked many accounts of the losses. In 1869 Van Malderghem made a serious study of the losses on Count Williams' side. He made a list of the deceased, with notes about which source mentioned them. The table shows the part of Van Malderghem's list that he based on the Chronique Anonyme de Valenciennes and Beke. Relevant fragments of the Chronique Anonyme de Valenciennes were published by Joseph Kervyn de Lettenhove in his Histoire et croniques de Flandre.

The author of the Chronique Anonyme de Valenciennes focused on the losses from the County of Hainaut. The monk Johannes de Beke from Egmond Abbey focused on casualties from the County of Holland. Beke thought that the knight bannerets, referred to as 'Domino de' or 'D' and marked with (b), were important enough to mention, even when they were not from Holland.

Commemoration

The Battle of Warns was annually celebrated on September 26 until the 16th century, then it moved to the last Saturday of September on which it is celebrated nowadays by nationalistic Frisians. There is a monument on the Red Cliffs in Warns since 1951, a large glacial erratic with the text leaver dea as slaef [sic] (rather dead than slave). The road to Scharl is still called the ferkearde wei (the wrong way) by the local inhabitants because this was the way the Hollandic knights chose and led to their downfall.

The Battle of Warnsveld was the inspiration for the historical novel De Roos van Dekama by Jacob van Lennep.

References

Notes

Warns
1345 in Europe
Warns
Warns
Warns
Warns
Súdwest-Fryslân